The Stramilano is an annual athletics event which takes place in Milan, Italy in spring. The event comprises three parts: the Stramilano International Half Marathon (a professional road running competition over 21.0975 km), the La Stramilano dei 50.000 (a 10 km non-competitive run/walk open to the general public) and the Stramilanina – a 5 km event for younger people.

The event was conceived in 1972 by the Italian Renato Cepparo. The idea took shape after the unexpected success of the Milan-Proserpio walk, a 43-km, "non-competitive" walk which Cepparo organized at the beginning with a handful of friends and then in an "open" format for anyone who wanted to take part starting from 18 September 1971.

The first Stramilano took place on 14 March 1972, as a nocturnal walk which ran along the entire outer ring road (about 22 km) and saw over 4,000 participants. Subsequently organisation was taken up by the sports group Fior di Roccia, and participation rose steadily until it settled at an average of 50,000 participants: for this reason the non-competitive race is called "Stramilano of the 50,000".

Over time, the event changed: the route was shortened (in 2008 it was cut down to 12 km and in 2009 it was further reduced to 10 km) and the non-competitive race was complemented, from 1976 by the "Stramilano Agonistica", reserved to professional athletes, run on the same distance as the "half marathon" (21 km and 97 m). Moreover, besides the main event the "Stramilanina" is also organised for children, with a route of only 6 km (reduced to 5 km in 2009).
In the last few years this event has been taken up as a model and similar events take place in foreign cities, for example the Stralugano in Lugano, Switzerland.

The 2020 edition of the event was postponed due to the coronavirus pandemic.

Half marathon winners

Key:

 † = The 1989 event featured a women's 10 km race which was won by New Zealand's Mary O'Connor in a time of 34:16 minutes.

References

List of winners
Albo d’oro. Stramilano. Retrieved on 2010-09-10.
Stramilano Half Marathon. Association of Road Racing Statisticians. Retrieved on 2010-09-10.

External links
 Official Stramilano website with English version

Athletics competitions in Italy
Half marathons
Sports competitions in Milan
Recurring sporting events established in 1972
Spring (season) events in Italy